Houston Ballet, operated by Houston Ballet Foundation, is a professional ballet company based in Houston, Texas. The company consists of 59 dancers and produces over 85 performances per year.

History

Tatiana Semenova (1955–1967) 
Houston developed its style for professional ballet beginning in the 1930s, with Ballet Russe de Monte Carlo. For eleven years, Ballet Russe de Monte Carlo spent a week during the Christmas season in Houston performing for Houston audiences. From this exposure grew a desire among patrons for a resident dance company. In the spring of 1955, Tatiana Semenova, a former dancer with Ballet Russe de Monte Carlo, was invited to start a ballet school in Houston. Semenova accepted, and a state charter was obtained to establish a Houston Foundation for Ballet on July 26, 1955.

Under Semenova's direction, the Foundation trained young dancers in ballet technique and reached out to under-served students. It established a scholarship program with the Neighborhood Centers Association to train students at Ripley House in Houston's East End, later advancing selected students into the school. Semenova remained the director until 1966.

Nina Popova (1967–1976) 
In 1967, Nina Popova, another alumna of Ballet Russe de Monte Carlo, was selected as the Foundation's next Artistic Director with the understanding that she was to create a company of professional dancers. By mid-December 1967, Popova had trained a corps of students and recruited students from other Houston dance studios to perform in an elegant full-length production of Giselle, featuring star dancers from American Ballet Theatre: Carla Fracci and Erik Bruhn as Giselle and Albrecht, Cynthia Gregory as Myrtha, and Terry Orr and Mariana Tcherkassky dancing the Peasant pas de deux.

By 1968, Popova began selecting and training dancers for a professional company. Auditions for dancers were held during the fall of 1968 in Houston, Dallas, New York and Los Angeles. Sixteen dancers began the first season and made their debut on February 17, 1969, at Sam Houston State Teachers College in Huntsville, Texas. This performance launched their statewide tour to 23 cities, which concluded with their Jones Hall premiere on May 14, 1969.

The company included four Academy-trained Houstonians, with imported dancers Judith Aaen and Anthony Sellers as Principals. In April 1972, Henry Holth, former Manager of Boston Ballet, was appointed as the executive head of the Houston Ballet Foundation. That same year, Houston Ballet performed Frederic Franklin’s Nutcracker for six post-Christmas performances in Jones Hall. These were Houston Ballet's first performances with a live orchestra.

By 1973, Houston Ballet's business offices had moved into Jones Hall. To attract a larger audience, guest stars were invited to perform with the company. Cynthia Gregory, Dame Margot Fonteyn, Desmond Kelly, Allegra Kent, Edward Villella, Natalia Makarova, and Ivan Nagy all guested during the next few seasons. More solo and leading dancers were added to the company, notably the Finnish couple Leo Ahonen and Soili Arvola.

After Popova resigned in February 1975, James Clouser, who had been a regular ballet master and a popular choreographer with both the dancers and audiences, was named interim Artistic Director while the board searched for Popova's replacement.

The board's artistic committee ultimately chose British-born Ben Stevenson as the next Artistic Director because of his classical foundation, his intense interest in training Academy students, and his international contacts that would attract the best talent to Houston. Clouser resigned after Stevenson was appointed, but not before Houston Ballet's world premiere of his rock ballet, Caliban, in May 1976.

Ben Stevenson OBE (1976–2003) 

Stevenson's goal of building a company by training its dancers in a resident academy won full support from Houston Ballet Foundation's trustees, and he ultimately succeeded in bringing the company to maturity. But it took time to achieve that goal. Having retained only 12 of the 28 dancers from Houston Ballet's Popova/Clouser years, Stevenson had to import nearly two-thirds of his company members.

Initially, four of the five principals were retained: Leo Ahonen, Soili Arvola, Matti Tikkanen, and Andrea Vodehnal, who had begun her childhood training in Houston. Several dancers from companies Stevenson had previously worked with followed him to Houston and became leading members of Houston Ballet over the next five to ten years. These dancers included Soloists: Suzanne Longley, Rosemary Miles, Janie Parker, and Dorio Pérez; and five Corps de Ballet dancers: Michael Bjerknes, Thomas Boyd, Jennifer Holmes, William Pizzuto, and Kristine Richmond.

For the next eleven years, Stevenson would choreograph several full-length ballets for the company: Cinderella, The Nutcracker, The Sleeping Beauty, Swan Lake, and Peer Gynt. Peer Gynt was Stevenson's first original story ballet. He also staged more than 20 of his one-act ballets while also engaging some of the most important choreographers of the time: Ronald Hynd, Barry Moreland, Hans van Manen, John Cranko, and Sir Frederick Ashton.

In 1980, former Ballet Russe de Monte Carlo executive J. B. Cerrone became General Manager of the company. During his tenure, the number of dancers, budget, and size of the orchestra grew tremendously. [citation needed]

Houston Ballet shared Jones Hall with the Houston Symphony, Houston Grand Opera, and the Society for the Performing Arts. In 1987, the Wortham Theater Center opened and became Houston Ballet's new performance home. The company launched its 1987–88 season on the new Wortham Theater Center's Brown Theater stage on September 2, 1987, with Stevenson's production of Romeo and Juliet, with Li Cunxin and Janie Parker in the title roles.

The opening of Wortham Theater Center marked the beginning of a new era for Houston Ballet. The dancers finally had a sprung dance floor, a deeper stage, ample backstage space, and an expanded lighting grid - improvements that created new production possibilities. Stevenson engaged Desmond Heeley to redesign and enhance the production quality of his staging of The Nutcracker. This production premiered on December 4, 1987, and would be performed annually by the company for the next 30 years.

In 1989, Houston Ballet appointed British choreographers Sir Kenneth MacMillan as Artistic Associate and Christopher Bruce as Associate Choreographer. Together, they brought modern influences to Houston Ballet's repertoire. Bruce introduced numerous works into Houston Ballet's repertoire over the next two decades, and MacMillan added five ballets, including his full-length Manon.

Throughout the remaining 14 years of his directorship, Stevenson blended elegant new productions of classic ballets – notably La Sylphide, Cinderella, The Sleeping Beauty, La Fille Mal Gardée, and Don Quixote - with world premieres of several of his original full-length and shorter ballets: Alice in Wonderland (1992), Dracula (1997), and The Snow Maiden (1998). Finally, he choreographed Cleopatra (1999) for Lauren Anderson.

Stevenson increased the number of guest choreographers by contracting works from internationally known dance-makers: Glen Tetley, James Kudelka, Paul Taylor, Jerome Robbins, Jiří Kylián, Lila York, William Forsythe, Natalie Weir, Brian Enos, Nacho Duato, David Parsons, Houston-born David Roussève, Farrell Dyde, Gillian Lynne, and Stanton Welch.

During his tenure, Stevenson also nurtured the choreographic careers of several of his dancers: Daniel Jamison, William Pizzuto, Barbara Bears, Sean Kelly, Ken Kempe, Timothy O’Keefe, Sandra Organ, Kristine Richmond, Dominic Walsh, and Trey McIntyre. Organ and Walsh went on to establish their own companies in Houston, and McIntyre's choreography was added to the repertoires of several major companies. He formed his own company in Idaho in 2005, after serving eight years as Houston Ballet's Choreographic Associate.

In 1995, Cecil C. Conner, Jr., was appointed as Managing Director bringing to Houston Ballet a professional background in law and several years managing Joffrey Ballet. Under Conner's leadership, Houston Ballet retired its accumulated deficit and quadrupled the company's endowment. [citation needed] During his 17-year tenure, Conner organized 12 tours both within the United States and internationally, greatly raising the company's artistic profile and leading the effort to build Houston Ballet's state-of-the-art facility, the Center for Dance. Following his retirement in 2012, Conner continued in an advisory capacity as Managing Director Emeritus.

Personal recognition from Great Britain came to Stevenson in 2000, when Queen Elizabeth II named him an Officer of the Order of the British Empire (OBE). In July 2003, Stevenson stepped down as Artistic Director, assuming the title of Artistic Director Emeritus of Houston Ballet. Stanton Welch AM became Houston Ballet's fifth Artistic Director.

Ben Stevenson now serves as the Artistic Director of Texas Ballet Theater in Fort Worth, Texas.

Li Cunxin and Janie Parker 
Janie Parker joined the company in 1976, Stevenson's first season as Artistic Director. She would quickly rise to Principal and danced with Houston Ballet for the next 20 years. She performed all of the title roles and had several ballets created on her. When Li Cunxin joined the company, Stevenson regularly paired them together. They were the leading partner of the Houston Ballet during their time.

Li Cunxin became one of Houston Ballet's shining stars, dancing with the company for 16 years. In 1979, Stevenson had travelled to China on behalf of Columbia University’s Cultural Exchange Center to teach a month of classes at the Beijing Academy of Dance. Upon his return, he invited two Chinese students, Li Cunxin and Zhang Weiqiang, for summer classes at Houston Ballet Academy. Li's strong technique won him an extended stay, but his sudden marriage to a fellow Academy student and his refusal to return to China when his visa expired briefly caused an international incident. When the issue was resolved in Li's favour, he was permitted to join Houston Ballet and quickly rose to become the company's most popular Principal male dancer of his time. The incident is recounted both in Li's 2003 autobiography, Mao’s Last Dancer, and the feature film based upon it.

Carlos Acosta and Lauren Anderson 
Lauren Anderson began her training at the age of seven at Houston Ballet Academy. In 1983, she was asked to join the company and became the company's second African-American dancer, following Sandra Organ who had joined Houston Ballet in 1982. In 1990, Anderson was promoted to principal dancer, becoming the company's first African-American principal.

In 1993, Stevenson appointed Cuban sensation Carlos Acosta as a new principal. Acosta and Anderson became a show-stopping pair; their dancing won accolades – at home as well as on national and international tours. It also brought praise from major U.S. dance critics for Stevenson's leadership among American ballet companies in featuring black dancers at Houston Ballet's highest level.

Anderson retired in 2006 at the age of 41. Upon her retirement, she was appointed Outreach Associate for Houston Ballet. In 2015, she was named Program Manager for the Education and Community Engagement department with Houston Ballet.

Anderson's signed pointe shoes were included in the permanent collection at the Smithsonian Institute's National Museum of African American History and Culture. Other memorabilia from Anderson's career will be included in temporary exhibits.

Stanton Welch AM (2003-present) 
In July 2003, Australian choreographer Stanton Welch assumed the leadership of Houston Ballet as Artistic Director. Since his arrival, Welch has transformed Houston Ballet by raising the level of classical technique; introducing works by distinguished and emerging choreographers such as Aszure Barton, David Bintley, Alexander Ekman, Nicolo Fonte, Tim Harbour, Edward Liang, Mark Morris, John Neumeier, Justin Peck, Garret Smith, and Twyla Tharp; adding to the company's repertoire important ballets by Kylián, Robbins, and others; and attracting some of the world's best coaches to work with the dancers. 

Since his designation as Artistic Director, Welch has premiered six full-lengths and more than 20 one-act ballets. His full-lengths include The Nutcracker, Giselle, Romeo & Juliet, Marie, Swan Lake, and La Bayadère. Almost all of Welch's full-length ballets have toured both nationally and internationally. In 2016, Welch returned home to Australia with the entire Houston Ballet company to tour his critically acclaimed 2015 staging of Romeo & Juliet to Melbourne and Sydney. In October 2018, Welch lead the company on a tour to Dubai, the United Arab Emirates for performances of his Swan Lake.

In October 2013, Welch's two-act ballet, Sons de L’âme, had its world premiere at the historic Théâtre des Champs-Élysées in Paris, France. Welch choreographed the evening-length ballet to music by Frédéric Chopin, which was performed by internationally acclaimed pianist Lang Lang. This special production was broadcast live on television across several European countries and was then formatted into a documentary film.

For his contributions to the world of dance, Welch was awarded the Order of Australia (AM) in June 2015. The prestigious Order of Australia Award is bestowed on Australian citizens for meritorious service in a particular area or field of activity. Welch was recognized for his significant service to the performing arts as a ballet dancer, mentor, choreographer, and artistic director.

In 2012, James Nelson was promoted from General Manager of Houston Ballet to the role of Executive Director. Through his leadership, Nelson has successfully guided the company financially through growth in the number of dancers and of performances and through several international tours, while also navigating the largest threat to Houston Ballet's financial stability, Hurricane Harvey. [citation needed]

During 2019–20, Stanton Welch AM and James Nelson lead Houston Ballet into its 50th anniversary.

Julie Kent is set to join Welch as co-artistic director in July 2023.

Dancers

Number of dancers 
On March 21, 1956, Tatiana Semenova presented 12 student dancers (six girls, six boys), including Suzelle Poole, in the first dance recital for Houston Foundation for Ballet.

On February 17, 1969, Nina Popova's newly formed professional company debuted at Sam Houston State Teachers College in Huntsville, Texas, which launched their Texas tour consisting of a 23-city tour of the state. They concluded the tour with their first performance in Jones Hall on May 14, 1969.

By 1971–72, Houston Ballet was dancing a 26-week season with an expanded 18-member company.

By the end of the 1973–74 season, the number of dancers had increased to 32.

Ben Stevenson presented a company of 28 dancers in his first year as Artistic Director. During the next 11 years, Stevenson would grow the company, and in his final year as Artistic Director, the number of dancers was 52.

After he was appointed Artistic Director, Stanton Welch continued to grow the size of the company. In 2015, Houston Ballet implemented a five-year strategic plan with goals to expand the company to 65 dancers by 2020. For the 2020–2021 season the company has 56 total dancers.

Rankings 
Houston Ballet ranks their dancers in the following categories, beginning with entry level: Apprentice, Corps de Ballet, Demi Soloist, Soloist, First Soloist, and Principal.

Houston Ballet Academy 

Houston Ballet Academy trains over 1,000 students a year and offers training designed to take students from their first introduction to movement through a full course of ballet study. The academy's faculty includes teachers who have performed with prestigious companies throughout the world.

The academy currently offers training in five different programs: Preschool Program, Pre-Professional Program, Professional Program, Houston Ballet II, and the Adult Program. The Preschool Program offers a selection of movement and dance classes for children ages 2–5. The Pre-Professional Program consists of students who are 6 years of age and older. The Professional Program is designed for students who meet the artistic expectations set forth by the Artistic Director Stanton Welch AM and for those students interested in a professional career in ballet. Houston Ballet II is the second company of Houston Ballet. It provides an opportunity for exceptional students to experience a more robust performance schedule that includes company participation, touring, and community performances. The Adult Program provides the community with a series of different classes at varying levels.

The academy also hosts a Summer Intensive Program each summer. This 6-week intensive is among the top summer training programs in the world.

Roughly 50% of the professional company has either come through the academy or participated in the Summer Intensive Program.

Education and community engagement 
Houston Ballet has a long history with community engagement. Under the leadership of Houston Ballet's first director, a scholarship program was established to advance students from the East End into the academy. From 1988 to 1994, Houston Ballet renewed these efforts by partnering with the Texas Institute for Arts in Education. By 1996, Houston Ballet had created an independent program called Talent Search, which in the ensuing years has evolved into what is now known as Chance to Dance.

In 1999, Houston Ballet's education programs were formalized into an effort called Education & Outreach, and in 2006 Lauren Anderson was appointed to the newly created position of Outreach Associate. By 2015, the department had been renamed Education & Community Engagement. The department manages 19 different dance education programs serving more than 60,000 participants a year.

Houston Ballet Orchestra 
Houston Ballet's first performance with a live orchestra was with the Houston Symphony. Together, they performed Nutcracker in December 1972. Houston Ballet and Houston Symphony would continue to perform together for the next several years.

One of Stevenson's long-term goals was to create an orchestra that specialized in the ballet repertoire. To achieve this goal, in 1983, he hired Glenn Langdon, who had been a rehearsal pianist, as music director. During his leadership, Langdon implemented the concept of a fully auditioned orchestra and increased the size of the string section. Langdon left Houston Ballet in 1989. After his departure, a series of highly regarded guest conductors led the next season. These conductors included John Lanchbery, Jack Everly, Stewart Kershaw, and Terrence Kern. Kershaw, who was music director for Pacific Northwest Ballet, was concurrently named as Houston Ballet's music director, a position he would hold for the next two seasons.

Ermanno Florio, who had been a guest conductor during the 1991–92 season, was appointed music director in 1992. Through Florio's direction and leadership, the orchestra rose to its current high level. Part of this progress can be attributed to the collaborative audition procedure that was established with Houston Grand Opera in 2001. The orchestra is currently a member of the Regional Orchestra Players Association and consists primarily of regional musicians. It is a per-service orchestra.

The Houston Ballet Orchestra currently sits at 61 part-time professional musicians with 56 core members. Additionally, there are eight full-time professional pianists and several part-time pianists and percussionists who play for classes and rehearsals.

Houston Ballet Guild 
Winifred Wallace, one of the Founding Trustees of Houston Ballet, had a dream: to build a women's auxiliary, or guild, to assist the goals and needs of the Foundation. Her dream came true on January 22, 1973, when the Houston Ballet Guild held its first meeting.

Houston Ballet Guild has grown from its original membership of 22 to more than 380 members with an active board of more than 50 women and men. Over the years, the Guild has expanded its commitment to the company and the Academy and has grown in its importance to Houston Ballet. The Guild provides an array of volunteer services and significant financial support (through Nutcracker Market revenue, membership dues and donations), along with events and programs designed to educate and generate community interest in dance.

Annually, over 300 Guild members volunteer more than 2,200 hours for a variety of projects, initiatives, and events. [citation needed]

Nutcracker Market 
In 1981, Houston Ballet Foundation Board member Preston Frazier envisioned a fundraising opportunity that would replicate a European holiday street market. Frazier approached the board of the Houston Ballet Guild with this concept as a means to raise much-needed revenue for Houston Ballet, its Academy, and scholarship programs. The first annual Nutcracker Market was met with great anticipation, and former First Lady Barbara Bush was among those in attendance. She would return both in 1986 and 2010 for the ribbon-cutting which opened the Market. Frazier's dream has grown steadily and spectacularly ─ from humble beginnings in a church bazaar setting to a four-day shopping extravaganza at NRG Center.

Annually, more than 100,000 customers shop to raise over $4.5 million for Houston Ballet, making the Market the single largest source of contributed income for the Houston Ballet Foundation.

With its many projects, initiatives, and direct contributions, as well as proceeds from the annual Nutcracker Market, Houston Ballet Guild has contributed over $86 million to Houston Ballet since its inception.

Locations 

 1st location – After receiving the official charter in 1955, Houston Ballet Foundation Board member Preston Bolton renovated his garage at 813 Lovett Boulevard into a dance studio.
 2nd location - In January 1963, Houston Ballet moved from its original garage apartment into a studio at 5115 Westheimer.
 3rd location - In August 1964, the company moved into a more centrally located second-story location at 2018 West Gray, with two studios and a small office.
 4th location – Upon his arrival, Stevenson insisted on more studio space if he were to successfully grow the school and the company. Mrs Harmon Whittington, a generous board member, financed the purchase of new ground-level quarters at 2615 Colquitt, with four studios nearly tripling Houston Ballet's available rehearsal space to 17,500 square feet.
 5th location – In 1984, Houston Ballet raised $5 million to buy, renovate and equip a two-story garment factory at 1921 West Bell Street, creating a new training, rehearsal, and office facility for the growing company, academy, and administrative staff.
 6th location – In 2011, Houston Ballet moved to its state-of-the-art [citation needed] facility, Houston Ballet Center for Dance, at 601 Preston Street in downtown Houston.

Houston Ballet Center for Dance

With 115,00 square feet spread over six floors and containing nine studios, Houston Ballet Center for Dance is the largest building dedicated to a professional dance company in the United States. The first floor of the Center for Dance houses the Margaret Alkek Williams Dance Lab, a black box facility that is regularly used for educational performances, lecture series, design meetings, and rehearsals. In addition to all Houston Ballet Administrative Offices, the Center for Dance also boasts an in-house costume shop, shoe room, music library, the Houston Ballet Academy Studios, the Professional Company's Studios and Dressing Rooms as well as a covered walkway that connects the Center for Dance to the backstage of the Wortham Theater Center.

Jesse H. Jones II and Anita Stude chaired the capital campaign for the Center for Dance. It was a two-pronged campaign that raised money to construct the building as well as increase Houston Ballet's endowment.

Excavation of the building site began in July 2009. On March 10, 2010, Houston Ballet hosted a party with dancers, staff members, donors, and friends to sign the last construction beam. In the end, the new building cost $46.6 million. Staff moved into the building in February 2011, and then-Mayor Annise Parker presided over the ribbon-cutting on April 9.

Displacement by Hurricane Harvey 
On August 26, 2017, Hurricane Harvey hit the city of Houston. Both the Houston Ballet Center for Dance and the Wortham Theater Center took on water, leaving the company and Academy without rehearsal and performance space just as the 2017–18 season was set to open.

Nevertheless, the long-anticipated Houston premiere of Sir Kenneth MacMillan’s Mayerling took place on schedule thanks to The Hobby Center for the Performing Arts, which opened its doors without hesitation.

While Hurricane Harvey affected operations at Houston Ballet only temporarily, the damage incurred within its theatre home, the Wortham Theater Center, was extensive. The Wortham received 15 feet of water and remained closed for the rest of the season. The Wortham serves as an important storage location for Houston Ballet costumes. Forty years of Houston Ballet history was lost to floodwaters. Wigs, tights, leotards, and speciality items to more than 50 productions were completely destroyed. Among the costumes lost were those for Mark Morris' The Letter V, Aszure Barton's Angular Momentum, and Christopher Bruce's Hush. In order to preserve the 2017–18 season, Houston Ballet launched its Hometown Tour and presented its planned season at alternate venues, including The Hobby Center for Performing Arts, Smart Financial Centre at Sugar Land, Houston Grand Opera's Resilience Theater at the George R. Brown Convention Center, the General Assembly Hall at the George R. Brown Convention Center, and Jones Hall.

Being displaced from the Wortham Theater Center is the greatest financial threat Houston Ballet has ever faced, and the total impact will be unknown for the next few more years.

Houston Ballet on film

Mao's Last Dancer 
In 2009, the autobiography of former Houston Ballet Principal dancer Li Cunxin - Mao’s Last Dancer - was made into a film by Australian director Bruce Beresford. It premiered on September 13, 2009, at the Toronto International Film Festival, was nominated for several Australian film awards, and won the AACTA Award for Best Original Music Score.

Sons de L’âme 
After its premiere in Paris in 2013, Sons de L’âme was formatted into a documentary film by director Olivier Simonnet. This documentary was presented at the 2014 Houston Cinema Arts Festival.

References

 
Ballet companies in the United States
Culture of Houston
Texas classical music
1969 establishments in Texas
Performing groups established in 1969
Tourist attractions in Houston